Jack L. Koenig is a chemical engineer noted for pioneering spectroscopic methods of polymer characterization.  In particular, he played a significant role in developing characterization methods to provide fundamental structure-property relationships for polymers used in thermoplastic and thermoset systems.

Koenig was elected a member of the National Academy of Engineering in 2000 for applications of spectroscopic methods of polymeric materials.

Education

Koenig earned his B.A. in Chemistry and Mathematics from Yankton College and his M.S. and Ph.D. in theoretical chemistry from the University of Nebraska.

Career

Before joining the faculty at Case Institute of Technology, he worked for a short time at DuPont on spectroscopic methods for characterizing polymers.

Early in his career he was mentored by Goodyear medalist Prof. J. Reid Shelton.

He is known for inventing the infrared method of measuring branches in polyethylene and for the method of determining the molecular weight of insoluble PTFE polymers. Both of his methods are now ASTM standard test methods.

As of 2014, he holds the position of Donnell Institute Professor Emeritus of the Dept. of Macromolecular Science and Engineering at Case Western Reserve University in Cleveland, OH.

Honors and awards 

2000 - Charles Goodyear Medal
2000 - Elected to the National Academy of Engineering (U.S.)
2006 - Plastics Academy Hall of Fame

External links
 Audio interview with Jack Koenig

References

Living people
Polymer scientists and engineers
Year of birth missing (living people)
Place of birth missing (living people)